is a district located in Nagano Prefecture, Japan.

As of December 1, 2005, the district has an estimated population of 40,041.

The district has three towns
Karuizawa
Miyota
Tateshina

District Timeline
On April 1, 2004, the village of Kitamimaki merged with the town of Tōbu, from Chiisagata District, to form the new city of Tōmi.
On April 1, 2005, the town of Mochizuki and the village of Asashina merged with the city of Saku and the town of Usuda from Minamisaku District to form the new city of Saku.

Districts in Nagano Prefecture